The Leidhorn is a mountain of the Silvretta Alps, located east of Klosters in the canton of Graubünden. The mountain lies between the valleys of Schlappintal and Monbiel.

References

External links
 Leidhorn on Hikr

Mountains of the Alps
Mountains of Switzerland
Mountains of Graubünden
Two-thousanders of Switzerland